Graphium cyrnus is a butterfly in the family Papilionidae. 

The top of the wings consist of black with many greenish-yellow dots, with the underside being roughly the same but instead of black, it is a reddish-brown.

It is found on Madagascar. The habitat consists of subhumid forests.

Taxonomy
It is a member of the  leonidas-group of closely species (Graphium leonidas, Graphium levassori, Graphium cyrnus).

References

cyrnus
Butterflies described in 1836
Butterflies of Africa
Taxa named by Jean Baptiste Boisduval